Clyde Wiegand (May 23, 1915, Long Beach, Washington – July 5, 1996) was an American physicist.

Wiegand received his undergraduate degree from Willamette University in 1940. He began his graduate work in physics in 1941 at UC Berkeley.

He was best known for the co-discovery of the antiproton in 1955, along with Owen Chamberlain, Emilio Segrè, and Thomas Ypsilantis. He was also a large contributor to the research of the atomic bomb.

He died at his home in Oakland, California of prostate cancer, aged 81.

References

External links
Obituary

1915 births
1996 deaths
20th-century American physicists
People from Oakland, California
UC Berkeley College of Letters and Science alumni
Willamette University alumni
Fellows of the American Physical Society
Deaths from prostate cancer
Deaths from cancer in California